Marisa Mell  (born Marlies Theres Moitzi; 24 February 1939 – 16 May 1992) was an Austrian actress. Typecast as a femme fatale in European arthouse and genre films, she is best regarded for her performances as Eva Kant in Mario Bava's critically re-assessed Danger: Diabolik (1968), and the dual role of Susan Dumurrier/Monica Weston in Lucio Fulci's giallo One on Top of the Other (1969).

After garnering popularity by appearing in such films as Venusberg (1963), French Dressing (1964), Masquerade (1965), Casanova 70 (1965) and  Secret Agent Super Dragon (1966), Mell's attempt to launch a Broadway and Hollywood career ended with the failure of her debut musical Mata Hari. She settled in Italy, where her high-profile love life and long association with Pier Luigi Torri, a playboy who later became one of the world's most-wanted fugitives, made her familiar to readers of tabloid press stories about the European jet set and elite Roman nightclubs. Her other notable films during this period include Anyone Can Play (1968), Marta (1971), Ben and Charlie (1972), Seven Blood-Stained Orchids (1972), Gang War in Milan (1973), Mahogany (1975), Casanova & Co. (1977) and Mad Dog Killer (1977).

Despite her typically resilient onscreen persona, Mell was privately a vulnerable figure who suffered from bad luck, ill-judged personal choices, and drug use. By the late 1980s, these factors had eroded the qualities that had earned her initial stardom, and she was forced to spend the remainder of her life in Austria, where she subsisted in straitened circumstances.

Career
Mell left her home city of Graz to attend the Max Reinhardt drama school where her fellow students briefly included Senta Berger. After four years in stage work, she began to appear in starring roles in European films.

In 1963, she was involved in a serious automobile accident in France. For six hours, she lay unconscious, unaware that she nearly lost her right eye. The disfigurement extended to her lip as well. She spent the next two years undergoing plastic surgery, and no damage remained in her face except for a distinctive curl of her upper lip.

After the Eurospy film Secret Agent Super Dragon (1966), she secured the title role in the "utterly calamitous" musical Mata Hari alongside Pernell Roberts. A preview performance in Washington, D.C. became infamous for its numerous technical problems, and producer David Merrick decided to close the  production. For the rest of her life, Mell had difficulty acknowledging the failure, which may have played a part in her moving to Italy where her stories of a successful Broadway run were not challenged. She said she had turned down a lucrative seven-year Hollywood contract because "the contract was a whole book. I think that even to go to the toilet I would have needed a permission." In 1968, Mell had her best-known film role as Eva Kant in Danger: Diabolik (1968), which initially was poorly received but has been championed by later film critics. At this time, Mell was appearing in what were by Italian standards major productions, which got American releases, such as Lucio Fulci's early giallo One on Top of the Other (1969). She suffered the death of a prematurely born daughter in 1969, and never had another child.

Mell's name had been romantically linked with number of European and Hollywood male stars, but in Italy she was often the center of paparazzi stories along with Pier Luigi Torri, her aristocratic, nightclub-owing boyfriend. In 1971, he got into a series of legal difficulties over cocaine being supplied to his nightclub's clients, and fled the country on his yacht. After being arrested in London over a $300 million gold mine and bank scam, and in an ironic echo of Danger: Diabolik, Torri got out the cell, made a daring and acrobatic rooftop escape, and evaded a huge search by infuriated English police; he eventually was recaptured in America after 18 months at large. As one of the more recognizable beauties in Italian film, Mell continued to work steadily throughout the 1970s, and posed for Italian Playboy.

Mell's marketability depended on her youth and stunning looks, which hardly faded, even as she moved into middle age. In Italy, where she had been a genuine celebrity, her box-office appeal had declined by the late 1980s, hardly unusual for a woman of her age in that era. Mell's public profile was very low by her latter years although she got some acting work shortly before her 1992 death in Vienna, aged 53, from throat cancer.

Selected filmography

 Das Licht der Liebe (1954) - (uncredited)
  (1959) - Liliane
 Der brave Soldat Schwejk (1960) - Olly (uncredited)
  (1960) - Alka
  (1960) - Inge
 Lebensborn (1961) - Erika Meuring
 The Cry of the Wild Geese (1961) - Judith Gare
 The Puzzle of the Red Orchid (1962) - Lilian Ranger
 Dr (1962) - Klara
 Venusberg (1963) - Florentine
 Der grüne Kakadu (1963) - Léocadie
 A Man in His Prime (1964) - Brigitte
 The Last Ride to Santa Cruz (1964) - Juanita
 French Dressing (1964) - Françoise Fayol
 Masquerade (1965) - Sophie
 Casanova 70 (1965) - Thelma
 Diamond Walkers (1965) - Irene de Ridder
 City of Fear (1965) - Ilona
 Train d'enfer (1965) - Frieda
 Secret Agent Super Dragon (1966) - Charity Farrel
 Objective 500 Million (1966) - Yo
 Che notte ragazzi! (1966) - Mónica
 Danger: Diabolik (1968) - Eva Kant
 Anyone Can Play (1968) - Paola
 Stuntman (1968) - Gloria Hall
 One on Top of the Other (1969) - Susan Dumurrier / Monica Weston
 Les belles au bois dormantes (1970) - Isabelle
 Senza via d'uscita (1970) - Michèle
 The Great Swindle (1971) - Carla
 Marta (1971) - Marta / Pilar
 Ben and Charlie (1972) - Sarah
 Seven Blood-Stained Orchids (1972) - Anna Sartori / Maria Sartori
 Alta tensión (1972) - Laura Moncada
 Tutti fratelli nel West… per parte di padre (1972) - Lulu 'Miss Dynamite' Belle
 Bella, ricca, lieve difetto fisico, cerca anima gemella (1973) - Paola
 Gang War in Milan (1973) - Jasmina Sanders
 Violent Blood Bath (1974) - Patricia Bataille
 La moglie giovane (1974) - Louisa
 Parapsycho – Spectrum of Fear (1975) - Greta
 La encadenada (1975) - Gina / Elisabeth
 Mahogany (1975) - Carlotta Gavina
 Amori, letti e tradimenti (1975) - Greta
 Taxi Love - Servizio per signora (1976)
 L'ultima volta (1976) - Jusy
 Casanova & Co. (1977) - Duchess of Cornaro
 Es muss nicht immer Kaviar sein (1977, TV series) - Chantal
 Mad Dog Killer (1977) - Giuliana
 Obscene Desire (1978) - Amanda
  (1979) - Agatha
 Under Siege (1980) - Kim Lombard
 La liceale al mare con l'amica di papà (1980) - Violante - wife of Massimo
 Peccati a Venezia (1980) - Melissa
 La compagna di viaggio (1980) - Woman with hat-veil
 Febbre a 40! (1980) - Linda Martin
 La dottoressa preferisce i marinai (1981) - Mrs. Clara Morelli
 Corpi nudi (1983) - Marisa
 Seifenblasen (1984) - Fernsehjournalistin
 La tempesta (1988)
 Quest for the Mighty Sword (1990) - Nephele
 Sensazioni d'amore (1990) - Signora Elena Aloisi
 I Love Vienna (1991) - Selina (final film role)

References

External links
 Marisa Mell fansite
 

1939 births
1992 deaths
Deaths from cancer in Austria
Deaths from esophageal cancer
Austrian film actresses
Spaghetti Western actresses
Actors from Graz
20th-century Austrian actresses